David Ira "Davy" Rothbart (born April 11, 1975) is a bestselling author, Emmy Award-winning filmmaker, contributor to This American Life, and the editor/publisher of Found Magazine.

Found Magazine
Davy Rothbart's magazine Found is dedicated to discarded notes, letters, flyers, photos, lists, and drawings found and sent in by readers. The magazine spawned a best-selling book, Found: The Best Lost, Tossed, and Forgotten Items from Around the World, published in April 2004. A second collection was published in May 2006, a third in May 2009. The magazine is published annually and co-edited by Rothbart's friend Sarah Locke.

Rothbart, a former Chicago Bulls ticket scalper, often tours the country to share finds and invite others to share their finds with him. His brother, musician Peter Rothbart, often accompanies him on these tours. In 2004, as he was on a nationwide tour to promote the Found book, he appeared twice on the television program the Late Show with David Letterman on CBS. He has since been featured on 20/20, MSNBC, and Last Call with Carson Daly, among other national TV and radio shows, and been profiled in The New Yorker and The New York Times.

Rothbart has toured the U.S. relentlessly with his live spoken-word show, reading from Found Magazine and his own books of stories and essays, appearing in all 50 states and over 200 cities; The Los Angeles Times calls him "an utterly engaging performer."

In the fall of 2014, Found The Musical opened off-Broadway at David Mamet and William H. Macy's Atlantic Theater Company in New York City for a 12-week run. The play, written by Lee Overtree and Hunter Bell, with songs by Eli Bolin and additional materials by the Story Pirates, starred Broadway vet Nick Blaemire as Davy, with Betsy Morgan, Barrett Wilbert Weed, Community's Danny Pudi, and Daniel Everidge, and received overwhelmingly positive reviews, including a "Critic's Pick" from Christopher Isherwood of The New York Times. A new production is planned for Fall of 2016, according to producers Victoria Lang, Eva Price, and Jamie Salka.

Writing and journalism
The Lone Surfer of Montana, Kansas, a collection of Rothbart's short stories, was published in August 2005 by Simon & Schuster. A shorter version of the same book was previously self-published by Rothbart's own production company, 21 Balloons Productions (named after Rothbart's favorite book, The 21 Balloons, by William Pène du Bois). An Italian edition, Il Surfista Solitario del Montana, was published in 2007 by Coniglio Editore. Actor Steve Buscemi optioned three stories from the book for film adaption, to be developed by Olive Productions; Buscemi has written the screenplay and plans to direct.

In September 2012, Rothbart's book of personal essays, My Heart Is An Idiot, was released by Farrar, Straus and Giroux. The book, which details Rothbart's lost loves and longtime life on the road, quickly garnered widespread praise, including positive reviews from The Los Angeles Times, The Washington Post, The New Yorker, and The New York Times Book Review, among many others. Upon the book's publication, Rothbart began a massive 79-city North American tour. My Heart Is An Idiot was named one of the Best Books of 2012 by NPR's Morning Edition, Amazon.com, Vanity Fair, and The Huffington Post. The paperback version was released by Picador in September 2013. In Italy, the book was published by Baldini & Castoldi in 2014 as Il Cuore è Idiota.

When Fred Rogers of the PBS television program Mister Rogers' Neighborhood died in February 2003, The New York Times ran an Op-Ed by Rothbart about his childhood encounters with Rogers similar to his story on This American Life. Rothbart's other work on This American Life includes stories about his deaf mother, Barbara Brodsky, a channeler and meditation teacher; a longtime friend seeking advice about an unplanned pregnancy; and his Chicago ticket scalping career. Rothbart also writes for GQ, The Believer, New York Magazine, Grantland, Dwell, SLAM Magazine, Maxim, and The Sun, and has a recurring column in Los Angeles Magazine.

In February 2013, TED released Rothbart's e-book How Did You End Up Here?: The Surprising Ways Our Questions Connect Us, which provides useful conversation-starters and reflections on the value of talking to strangers. Rothbart has spoken at numerous TEDx events, the PopTech Conference, CUSP, AIGA San Francisco, Nike, EA Sports, Amazon, and ad agency Wieden+Kennedy, and hosted TEDxIndianapolis in October, 2013.

At the University of Michigan, Rothbart won the Arthur Miller Award, the Lawrence Kasdan Scholarship, and nine Hopwood Awards, making him the most decorated writer in the school's 205-year history.

Film
In December 2006, Geffen Records released Rothbart's documentary film How We Survive about the punk rock band Rise Against on a DVD called Generation Lost. His second Rise Against documentary, Another Station: Another Mile, which follows the band as they write songs for a new album and perform shows around the world, was released in October 2010, and was among the year's bestselling music DVDs in the U.S. and Germany. In May 2011, Rothbart directed a behind-the-scenes featurette for ItGetsBetter.org about the making of Rise Against's "Make It Stop" video, which was nominated for a MTV Video Music Award. Rothbart and Rise Against lead singer Tim McIlrath are former roommates.

In the spring of 2008, Easier with Practice, a film based on an article Rothbart wrote for GQ about his life on tour, was shot in Albuquerque, New Mexico. The movie, written and directed by Kyle Patrick Alvarez, stars Brian Geraghty (The Hurt Locker; Boardwalk Empire) as Davy and Kel O'Neill as Davy's brother; it premiered June 12, 2009 at the CineVegas Film Festival and was awarded the Grand Jury Prize by actor and festival chairman Dennis Hopper. Easier With Practice premiered internationally at the Edinburgh Film Festival, where it won the prize for Best Feature. In December 2009, Easier With Practice was nominated for two Independent Spirit Awards. The film was released in theaters in February 2010, and met with great critical success: The Los Angeles Times called Easier With Practice "fresh, flawless, and totally captivating," and The Village Voice praised the film as "emotionally honest and achingly true."

In January 2009, Rothbart filmed his first full-length narrative feature, Overhaul, which stars rapper Daniel "D Shot" Garvatt as a pizza driver in desperate circumstances on New Year's Eve. Rothbart himself delivered for Bell's Pizza in Ann Arbor, Michigan for six years. Overhaul was scheduled to be released in 2015.

From late 2010 to spring of 2012, Rothbart filmed a documentary called Medora, which follows a resilient high-school basketball team in the small, struggling town of Medora, Indiana. The film, co-directed by Rothbart and Andrew Cohn, premiered at SXSW in 2013
 and was released in theaters in fall 2013, receiving widespread praise from The New York Times, The Village Voice, NPR, The Los Angeles Times, and The Washington Post, which named it one of the Best Films of 2013. Currently, Medora holds a 92% "Fresh" rating on Rotten Tomatoes. The film aired in April, 2014 on the acclaimed PBS series Independent Lens, earning an Emmy Award. The documentary was produced by Beachside Films and Steve Buscemi, Stanley Tucci, and Wren Arthur of Olive Productions, among others.

Rothbart is the subject of a documentary, directed by David Meiklejohn, called My Heart Is An Idiot, which premiered in April 2011, and screened in twenty U.S. cities that spring. He has also made token appearances as an actor, including a role as Miami night club manager Jake Sylvano in the film The Strongest Man, directed by Kenny Riches, which premiered in January, 2015 at the Sundance Film Festival.

In 2021, Rothbart's documentary 17 Blocks, which tracks the Sanford Family in Southeast Washington, D.C. over the course of 20 years, was released by MTV Documentary Films, executive produced by Sheila Nevins, with impact partners Black Lives Matter, D.C., and Everytown for Gun Safety. The film earned rapturous praise, including rave reviews in Variety, which called it "a singular achievement in documentary filmmaking," The New York Times ("unshakable!"), and Screen International: "Boyhood N' The Hood... packed with gritty realism. We marvel at the hidden powers of the powerless; how, when nearly broken, some people grow back stronger... And we're invited to celebrate the possibilities of change." 17 Blocks holds a 100% "Fresh" rating on Rotten Tomatoes, with 27 reviews. For his work directing and producing 17 Blocks, Rothbart was nominated for an Independent Spirit Award. The film also received two Cinema Eye Honors Award nominations. 17 Blocks won top festival awards at the Tribeca Film Festival, Woodstock, Telluride Mountainfilm, São Paulo, Melbourne, Karlovy Vary, San Francisco, Zurich, and 25 other festivals, and was also released widely across France in June, 2021, and in Japan in November, 2021, under the title Landscape of Family.

Washington To Washington
Rothbart is the founder of Washington To Washington, an annual hiking adventure which brings inner-city kids from Washington, D.C., New Orleans, and Southeast Michigan to New Hampshire for a climb to the top of Mt. Washington. He directs the Found Magazine Prison Pen-Pal Program, connecting Found readers on the outside with those behind bars, and is also active with the youth writing programs 826 National, 826michigan, and 826LA.

Personal life
A graduate of the alternative Community High School and the University of Michigan, Rothbart lives in Ann Arbor, Michigan and Los Angeles, California. His brother is photojournalist  Michael Forster Rothbart.

Radio
Davy Rothbart's stories were featured on the following episodes of This American Life:
 184 – Neighbors
 212 – The Other Man
 224 – Middlemen
 239 – Lost in America
 262 – Miracle Cures
 306 – Seemed Like a Good Idea at the Time
 327 – By Proxy

References

External links
17 Blocks
Found Magazine
My Heart Is An Idiot
Medora
21 Balloons Productions 
Washington To Washington
The New York Times profiles Davy Rothbart
Davy Rothbart's Op-Ed tribute of Fred Rogers
Davy Rothbart on Late Show with David Letterman (Oct. 2004)
Davy Rothbart on Late Show with David Letterman (April 2004)
PopGurls Interview: Davy Rothbart
Interview on The Sound of Young America (July 2006)
Podcast of presentation at Pop!Tech 2005
Heavy In The Streets Interviews Davy Rothbart
20 Questions with Davy Rothbart
Davy Rothbart, My Heart is an Idiot blog on AOL Life & Style 
Davy Rothbart – MIPtalk.com Interview
Song about Davy Rothbart by Papa Razzi and the Photogs.

1975 births
Writers from Ann Arbor, Michigan
Living people
This American Life people
University of Michigan alumni